The 2017–18 season was the 119th season in the history of FC Bayern Munich, a German football club, and their 53rd consecutive season in the top flight of German football, the Bundesliga, since it was established in 1965. Bayern Munich also participated in the DFB-Pokal and the UEFA Champions League. Bayern were the reigning Bundesliga champions, and therefore also participated in the DFL-Supercup. This is the 13th season for Bayern in the Allianz Arena, located in Munich, Bavaria, Germany.

The season was the first since 2004–05 without former captain Philipp Lahm, who retired after the 2016–17 season.

Season overview

Background
In the previous season, Bayern won a record-setting fifth consecutive and 26th overall Bundesliga title, and 27th German title. They also won the DFL-Supercup, beating Borussia Dortmund. Bayern Munich were knocked out of the DFB-Pokal in the semi-finals by Borussia Dortmund, and were knocked out of the UEFA Champions League in the quarter-finals by Real Madrid.

On 15 January 2017, Bayern announced the signing of Niklas Süle and Sebastian Rudy, both from 1899 Hoffenheim. Süle was signed for an undisclosed fee, with a five-year contract lasting until 2022. Rudy joined on a free transfer, signing a three-year contract until 2020. On 7 February, Bayern captain Philipp Lahm confirmed his retirement at the end of the 2016–17 season. On 9 March, Xabi Alonso announced his retirement at the end of the 2016–17 campaign. On 14 March, Bayern announced that youth player Marco Friedl signed his first professional contract, lasting four years until 2021. On 27 April, Bayern announced the permanent signing of Kingsley Coman in the summer for €21 million, previously on loan from Juventus, with a contract running for three years until 2020. On 12 May, Bayern announced that Holger Badstuber, on loan to Schakle 04, would be released on a free transfer in the summer following the end of his contract on 30 June. Also on 12 May, Bayern announced that Juventus permanently signed Medhi Benatia for €17 million, on loan from Bayern since the start of the 2016–17 season. On 17 May, it was announced that youth goalkeeper Christian Früchtl would be the third-string goalkeeper for the 2017–18 season. On 19 May, it was announced that goalkeeper Tom Starke would retire at the end of the 2016–17 season. On 24 May, Bayern youth defender Felix Götze signed a professional contract with the club, with a two-year contract lasting until 2019. On 11 June, Bayern signed German forward Serge Gnabry from Werder Bremen for an undisclosed fee, with a three-year contract lasting until 2020. On 14 June, Bayern announced the signing of midfielder Corentin Tolisso from Lyon for €41.5 million plus possible add-ons up to an additional €6 million, with a five-year contract lasting until 2022. On 30 June, it was announced that Gianluca Gaudino, who was returning to Bayern following his loan spell at FC St. Gallen, would move to Chievo.

On 29 April, after winning the Bundesliga, Bayern confirmed a spot in the 2017 DFL-Supercup, taking place on 5 August, and will play away to the winners of the 2016–17 DFB-Pokal, Borussia Dortmund.

On 14 March, it was announced that Bayern would take part in the 2017 International Champions Cup in July as part of the 2017 Audi Summer Tour. The first two matches will take place in China as part of the 2017 Audi Football Summit. The first match is against Arsenal on 19 July in Shanghai, and the second against Milan on 22 July in Shenzhen. The final two matches will take place in Singapore, with Bayern playing Chelsea on 25 July and Internazionale on 27 July. On 21 April, it was announced that Bayern would take part in the summer 2017 edition of the Telekom Cup, taking place at the BORUSSIA-PARK in Mönchengladbach on 15 July. On 12 May, Bayern announced they would host the 2017 Audi Cup, the fifth edition of the pre-season tournament, at the Allianz Arena. Bayern will face Liverpool in the first round, with Atlético Madrid and Napoli contesting the other semi-final.

On 9 June, Bayern announced the appointment of former player Willy Sagnol as assistant manager, joining head coach Carlo Ancelotti and assistant coach Davide Ancelotti from 1 July 2017.

On 11 June, Bayern were drawn against Chemnitzer FC in the first round of the DFB-Pokal.

On 29 June, the Bundesliga schedule for the 2017–18 season was released, with Bayern playing Bayer Leverkusen in the opening fixture.

July
Training for the new season began on 1 July. Players that returned for training included Juan Bernat, Kingsley Coman, Marco Friedl, Christian Früchtl, Mats Hummels, Javi Martínez, Thomas Müller, and Franck Ribéry. Tom Starke, who retired at the end of the previous season, returned as standby professional to help during pre-season training while Bayern's other goalkeepers were still recovering from injury. Manuel Neuer and Jérôme Boateng continued their rehabilitation program in the performance center. The rest of the first-team squad were scheduled to return to training on 10 July.

On 6 July, Bayern faced BCF Wolfratshausen in the first friendly match of the season, which was only 60 minutes long. Bayern won the match 4–1, with a goal from Manuel Wintzheimer and Thomas Müller, and a brace from Franck Evina.

On 7 July, Bayern announced the squad for the 2017 Audi Summer Tour to China and Singapore. Manuel Neuer and Sven Ulreich will not join the squad, still recovering from injury. Serge Gnabry, Joshua Kimmich, Sebastian Rudy, Niklas Süle, and Arturo Vidal were also not included in the squad, given an extended summer break after international tournaments.

On 9 July, Bayern faced FSV Erlangen-Bruck in a charity match. Bayern won the match 9–1, with goals from Marco Friedl, Michael Strein, and Raphael Obermair, and braces from Franck Evina, Kingsley Coman, and Marco Hingerl. On 10 July, additional players returned from summer holiday, including David Alaba, Robert Lewandowski, Rafinha, Arjen Robben, Thiago, and Corentin Tolisso.

On 11 July, Bayern announced the signing of Colombian midfielder James Rodríguez from Real Madrid on a two-year loan spell, lasting until 2019, with an option to make the move permanent. He will also join the squad for the Audi Summer Tour in Asia.

Players

Squad information

Transfers

In

Out

Friendly matches

Competitions

Overview

Bundesliga

League table

Results summary

Results by round

Matches

DFB-Pokal

DFL-Supercup

UEFA Champions League

Group stage

Knockout phase

Round of 16

Quarter-finals

Semi-finals

Statistics

Appearances and goals

! colspan="13" style="background:#DCDCDC; text-align:center" | Players transferred out during the season
|-

|}

Goalscorers

Clean sheets

Disciplinary record

References

FC Bayern Munich seasons
Munich, Bayern, FC
Bayern Munich
German football championship-winning seasons